Ncase may refer to:

 National Congress on Aviation and Space Education (NCASE), annual conference sponsored by Civil Air Patrol
 Nicky Case, a Canadian indie game developer known as Ncase
 ncase, application by Zango (company) (formerly known as 180solutions)